Sushilkumar Sambhaji Shinde (born 4 September 1941) is an Indian politician from the state of Maharashtra. He was the Minister of Home Affairs, Minister of Power in the Manmohan Singh government, and the Leader of the House in Lok Sabha until 26 May 2014. He previously served as the Chief Minister of Maharashtra from 18 January 2003 to October 2004.

Early life and education
Shinde was born on 4 September 1941 at Solapur in a Dhor caste to Sambhaji Rao Shinde and Sakhu Bai. Shinde completed his education with an honours degree in arts from Dayanand College, Solapur and LLB from ILS Law College and New Law College, University of Bombay, Maharashtra.

Early career
Sushilkumar Shinde started his career as a bailiff in the Sessions court of Solapur where he worked from 1957 – 1965. He then joined the Maharashtra Police as a constable. Subsequently, he served in the Maharashtra CID for six years, as a sub-inspector of police, under Amukuraj Patil, his CID mentor.

Political career
In the year 1971, Shinde became a member of the Congress Party.  He won the Maharashtra state assembly elections in 1974, 1980, 1985, 1990, 1992, 24 May 2003 to August 2004–(General) by-election, September 2004 to 2 October 2004–(General). Shinde was elected to Rajya Sabha from Maharashtra during July 1992 to March 1998. In 1999, he acted as campaign manager of the Congress chairperson Sonia Gandhi in Amethi, Uttar Pradesh. In 2002, Shinde lost the election for the post of Vice-President of India contesting against the National Democratic Alliance candidate Bhairon Singh Shekhawat. He served as the chief minister of Maharashtra from 2003 to 2004. He was appointed the Governor of Andhra Pradesh on 30 October 2004 replacing Surjit Singh Barnala, who became the Governor of Tamil Nadu. He left the office on 29 January 2006.

Shinde was elected unopposed to the Rajya Sabha for the second time from Maharashtra on 20 March 2006. Shinde became the leader of Lok Sabha after his predecessor Pranab Mukherjee was elected President of India. Shinde served as Power minister of India from 2006 to 2012. Later, he was appointed Home Minister of India in 2012. His tenure as a Home Minister saw two major decisions of hanging the terrorists Afzal Guru and Ajmal Kasab.

During the 2012 northern India power grid failure, Shinde deflected criticism by observing that India was not alone in suffering major power outages, as the United States and Brazil had both experienced similar blackouts within the previous few years. Officials in Uttar Pradesh, where the problem was believed to have begun, said the grid could not keep up with the huge demand for power in the hot summer. Uttar Pradesh power corporation chief Awanish Kumar Awasthi stated that the grid collapse was due to the states drawing more than their allotted power to meet the summer demand.

In 2014 Lok Sabha elections, Shinde was the Congress party nominee. He was defeated by BJP Candidate Mr. Sharad Bansode.

Sushilkumar Shinde contested the 2019 Lok Sabha elections from Solapur. Shinde was the Congress party nominee. He was defeated by BJP Candidate Mr. Siddheshwar Maharaj by a margin of 156,261 votes.

According to him, 2019 Indian general elections were the last Lok Sabha elections contested by him.

Personal life 
Shinde married Ujwala Shinde on 1 May 1970. The couple has three daughters. One of his daughters Praniti Shinde is MLA of Solapur, Maharashtra India.

Awards & honours 

 15 January 1977: Selected in Ten Noteworthy Youth of the country by Indian Jaycees.
 1978: Second choice as most popular Minister in the survey by 'Manohar' a weekly.
 1981: Honoured with Basav Bhushan Award as "Ideal Youth" by Congress Party.
 9 March 1996: "National Citizen Award" as a Best Member of Parliament at the hands of Mother Teresa.
 2003: Bhai Bagal Award 2003, Third place at India Today – Reader's Choice The Best Chief Minister.
 2005: Guruvarya Shankarrao Kanitkar Award at the hands of senior journalist Arun Tikekar.
 22 September 2005 to 21 September 2007 & 21 November 2007 to 24 December 2009: Tilak Maharashtra Vidhyapeeth Chancellor.
 23 January 2007: First D Lit. awarded by D Y Patil University. (Subject – Literature)
 9 September 2007: Second D Lit. degree awarded by Srikrishna Devrai University, Andhra Pradesh. (Subject – Literature)
 18 February 2009: Third D Lit. awarded by Rajiv Gandhi Technical University, Bhopal. (Subject – Science)
 9 May 2009: "Navshakti Jeevan Gaurav Puraskar" awarded by Navshakti Times.
 19 July 2009: Government Award of "Ideal Teacher" in memory of Education Officer Hon. B.C. Dhegale.

Positions held 
Source:
 1974 – 1992: Member, Maharashtra Legislative Assembly
 1974 – 1975: Minister of State for Sports and Cultural Affairs, Government of Maharashtra
 1975 – 1977: Minister of State for Finance, Family Welfare, Sports and Cultural Affairs, Government of Maharashtra
 1978: Cabinet Minister for Labour and Tourism, Government of Maharashtra
 1983 – 1985: Cabinet Minister for Finance, Planning, Sports and Cultural Affairs, Government of Maharashtra
 1985: Cabinet Minister for Finance, Planning, Environment, Government of Maharashtra
 1986: Cabinet Minister for Finance, Planning, Industry, Law and Judiciary, Social Welfare, Government of Maharashtra
 1988 – 1990: Cabinet Minister for Finance, Cultural Affairs, Sports and Planning, Government of Maharashtra
 1990: Cabinet Minister for Urban Development, Government of Maharashtra
 1991: Cabinet Minister for Urban Development, Law and Judiciary, Government of Maharashtra
 1992: Elected to Rajya Sabha
 1998 – 1999: Member, Twelfth Lok Sabha
 1999 – 2003: Member, Thirteenth Lok Sabha
 2003 – 2004: Member, Maharashtra Legislative Assembly
 2004: Chief Minister, Maharashtra
 2004 – 2006: Governor of Andhra Pradesh
 2006: Member, Rajya Sabha and Union Cabinet Minister of Power
 2009: Re-elected to 15th Lok Sabha
 31 May – 31 July: Union Cabinet Minister, Power
 Aug 2012: Union Cabinet Minister, Home Affairs
 30 Aug 2012: Leader of the House, Lok Sabha

Theatre & films 

The Marathi film, Dusari Goshta (2014) and a documentary film Andherese Ujale Ki Aour are based on his life from childhood to becoming a popular politician.

References

External links

 Profile on Rajya Sabha website

|-

|-

|-

1941 births
India MPs 1998–1999
India MPs 1999–2004
India MPs 2009–2014
Chief Ministers of Maharashtra
Governors of Andhra Pradesh
Indian National Congress politicians from Maharashtra
Indian vice-presidential candidates
Living people
Lok Sabha members from Maharashtra
Maharashtra MLAs 1978–1980
Maharashtra MLAs 1980–1985
Maharashtra MLAs 1985–1990
Maharashtra MLAs 1990–1995
Marathi politicians
Members of the Cabinet of India
Ministers of Internal Affairs of India
People from Solapur
Rajya Sabha members from Maharashtra
Union Ministers from Maharashtra
United Progressive Alliance candidates in the 2014 Indian general election
Leaders of the Lok Sabha
Chief ministers from Indian National Congress
Ministers of Power of India